The Society for American Music (SAM) was founded in 1975 and was first named the Sonneck Society in honor of Oscar George Theodore Sonneck, early Chief of the Music Division in the Library of Congress and pioneer scholar of American music. The Society for American Music is a non-profit scholarly and educational organization incorporated in the District of Columbia as a 501 (c) (3) and is a constituent member of the American Council of Learned Societies. It is based at the Stephen Foster Memorial on the campus of the University of Pittsburgh in Pittsburgh, Pennsylvania.

About 
The mission of the Society for American Music is to stimulate the appreciation, performance, creation, and study of American music in all its diversity. "America" is understood to embrace both American, including North, Central, and South America and the Caribbean, as well as aspects of these cultures everywhere in the world.

The Society holds an annual conference, usually in March, featuring scholarly talks, exhibits, and performances.

Publications 
In 2007, the Society began publishing its own journal, the Journal of the Society for American Music (JSAM). From 1983 through 2006, the Society had published the journal American Music in collaboration with the University of Illinois Press.

Lifetime Achievement Award 
The Lifetime Achievement Award is presented by the Society "in recognition of the recipient’s significant and substantial lifetime achievement in scholarship, performance, teaching, and/or support of American Music."

Award recipients are:

References

External links 

SAM Website

Arts organizations established in 1975
Member organizations of the American Council of Learned Societies
Learned societies of the United States
1975 establishments in the United States